Hans Schwarz (1492 – after 1521), was a German sculptor and medallist.

Biography
He was born in Augsburg, Germany and according to the RKD he died around 1532. He is known for crafting medals and medallions.

References

1492 births
1532 deaths
German sculptors
German male sculptors
German numismatists
Artists from Augsburg